Tänassilma may refer to several places in Estonia:

Tänassilma, Harju County, village in Saku Parish, Harju County
Tänassilma, Viljandi County, village in Viljandi Parish, Viljandi County

See also
Tännassilma (disambiguation)